{{Infobox film awards
| number           = 28
| award            = FAMAS Awards
| image            = 
| caption          = 
| date             = 1980
| site             = Manila Midtown Ramada 
| host             =  
| producer         = 
| director         =  
| best_picture     =  'Jaguar ~ Bancom AudioVision | most_wins        =  Durugin si Totoy Bato ~ FPJ Productions (5 wins)
| most_nominations =  
| network          = 
| duration         = 
| ratings          = 
| last             = 27th
| next             = 29th
}}

The 28th Filipino Academy of Movie Arts and Sciences Awards Night was held in 1979 at Manila Midtown Ramada, Philippines .  This is for the Outstanding Achievements of the different  films for the year 1979.Durugin si Totoy Bato of FPJ Productions was the most awarded film of the 28th FAMAS Awards with 5 wins.  However, it failed to win the FAMAS Award for Best Picture.  "Jaguar", a film by Lino Brocka won the Best Picture as well as the best director for him.  The Philippines biggest stars also won the top acting awards.  Nora Aunor won the best Actress for her critically acclaimed movie Ina ka ng Anak Mo.   Fernando Poe Jr. won the best actor as an underdog fighter who fights and won against all odds.

"Jaguar" was also screened and nominated for Palm d'Ore at the 1980 Cannes Film Festival

Awards

Major Awards
Winners are listed first and highlighted with boldface.

{| class=wikitable
|-
! style="background:#EEDD82; width:50%" | Best Picture
! style="background:#EEDD82; width:50%" | Best Director
|-
| valign="top" |
 Jaguar — Bancom Audiovision Durugin si Totoy Bato — FPJ Productions 
 Huwag, Bayaw — Seven Wonders Productions 
 Ina ka ng Anak Mo — Premiere Productions 
 Ang Lihim ng Guadalupe — FPJ Productions 
| valign="top" |
 Lino Brocka— Jaguar Armando A. Herrera — Durugin si Totoy Bato 
 Manuel Fyke Cinco — Huwag, Bayaw 
 Pablo Santiago —  Kasal-kasalan, Bahay-bahayan 
 Robert Arevalo — Sino'ng Pipigil sa Pagpakat ng Ulan 
|-
! style="background:#EEDD82; width:50%" | Best Actor
! style="background:#EEDD82; width:50%" | Best Actress
|-
| valign="top" |
 Fernando Poe Jr. — Durugin si Totoy Bato Christopher De Leon — Ang Alamat ni Julian Makabayan
 Anthony Alonzo — Dakpin si Junior Bumbay 
 Ernie Garcia — Pagmamahal mo Buhay Ko 
 Rudy Fernandez — Star 
| valign="top" |
 Nora Aunor — Ina ka ng Anak Mo
 Vilma Santos — Halik sa Paa, Halik sa Kamay 
 Beth Bautista — Huwag, Bayaw 
 Charito Solis — Ina, Kapatid, Anak 
 Liza Lorena — Gabun 
|-
! style="background:#EEDD82; width:50%" | Best Supporting Actor
! style="background:#EEDD82; width:50%" | Best Supporting Actress
|-
| valign="top" |
 Leroy Salvador — Init
 Johnny Delgado — Ang Alamat ni Julian Makabayan 
 Paquito Diaz — Durugin si Totoy Bato 
 Menggie Cobarrubias — Jaguar 
 Vic Silayan — Star 
| valign="top" |
 Perla Bautista — Ang Alamat ni Julian Magabayan
 Laurice Guillen — Init 
 Rebecca Gonzales — Kasal-kasalan, Bahay-bahayan 
 Rustica Carpio — Menor de edad 
 Rita Gomez — Salawahan 
|-
! style="background:#EEDD82; width:50%" | Best Child Actor
! style="background:#EEDD82; width:50%" | Best Child Actress
|-
| valign="top" |
  Bentot Jr. — Ang lihim ng Guadalupe
 Niño Muhlach — Kuwatog 
 Rapp Rivera — Mahal kong Taksil 
 Hero Bautista — Roberta Bongchi Miraflor — Salawahan | valign="top" |
 Julie Vega  — Durugin si Totoy Bato 
 Crystal — Huwag, Bayaw|-
! style="background:#EEDD82; width:50%" | Best in Screenplay
! style="background:#EEDD82; width:50%" | Best Story
|-
| valign="top" |
  Eddie Romero & Fred Navarro — Durugin si Totoy Bato
| valign="top" |
  Carlo J. Caparras — Durugin si Totoy Bato 
 Letecia Fariñas — Ina ka ng Anak Mo|-
! style="background:#EEDD82; width:50%" | Best Sound 
! style="background:#EEDD82; width:50%" | Best Musical Score
|-
| valign="top" |
    Rudy Baldovino  — Ang LIhim ng Guadalupe 
| valign="top" |
   George Canseco  — Huwag, Bayaw 
|-
! style="background:#EEDD82; width:50%" | Best Cinematography 
! style="background:#EEDD82; width:50%" | Best Production Design
|-
| valign="top" |
   Ben Lobo  — ANg LIhim ng Guadalupe 
| valign="top" |
   Napoleon Enriquez  — Ang Lihim ng Guadalupe 
|-
! style="background:#EEDD82; width:50%" |  Best Editing
! style="background:#EEDD82; width:50%" | Best Theme Song
|-
| valign="top" |
  Ben Barcelon — Durugin si Totoy Bato
| valign="top" |
  George Canseco  — Huwag Bayaw 
 Pablo Vergara — Mahal.. Ginagabi ka na naman'' 
|-
|}

Special AwardeeDr. Ciriaco Santiago Memorial Award Jesse EjercitoLou Salvador, Sr. Memorial AwardLevi CelerioDr. Jose Perez Memorial Award Boots Anson-RoaGregorio Valdez Memorial AwardEddie GarciaPosthumous AwardsJose Padilla, Jr.
Canuplin
Patsy
Clodualdo del Mundo, Sr.
Norberto AmorantoHall of Fame Awardee'''
Augusto Buenaventura - Screenplay
1977 - Bakya Mo Neneng
1973 - Erap Is My Guy
1972 - Kill The Pushers
1970 - Psycho Sex Killer
1957 - Kalibre .45

References

External links
FAMAS Awards 

FAMAS Award
FAMAS
FAMAS